Susan Rachel Swift is an American actress and former child actress best known for her role as Ivy Templeton in Audrey Rose.

Early life
Swift was born in Houston, Texas. She has one sister, Katharine. At the time when Audrey Rose was filmed, she was attending Webster Intermediate School in Webster, TX. She attended Pepperdine University and became an attorney, practicing in Downtown Los Angeles.

Acting career

Swift made her acting debut in 1977 at the age of 13, in the horror film Audrey Rose, as Ivy Templeton, a young girl suffering from disturbing nightmares because she is the reincarnation of a girl named Audrey Rose. Produced by Frank De Felitta, a nationwide search was done to identify a young girl to play the lead role and Swift won the role after being scouted at a local theater group at her middle school. De Felitta wanted to avoid casting a known child actor and was rather looking for 'the perfect face' to play the lead role.

The following year, Swift appeared as 14-year-old Dee Johnson in the comedy Harper Valley PTA, with Barbara Eden and Ronny Cox. In 1981, she starred in her first leading role, in the Bert I. Gordon film Burned at the Stake. Her final film appearance came in 1995, when she starred in Halloween: The Curse of Michael Myers, with Donald Pleasence, Paul Rudd and Marianne Hagan.

Swift has a short film career, as well as a short television career for which she appeared in several guest roles during the 1970s and '80s. Her first television role was in the CBS mini-series The Chisholms, which ran for a total of 13 episodes over a year.  They also include the short-lived series Seven Brides for Seven Brothers, which lasted one season, the Golden Globe-winning Magnum, P.I., Amazing Stories and Simon & Simon. Among her television film credits are Featherstone's Nest, The Six of Us and A Killer in the Family.

Business career 
 
In recent years, attorney Swift's career has shifted to one of legal adviser, working in coordination with former Olympian, medalist and World Record holder Leah Poulos-Mueller, senior partner at Poulos-Mueller Attorneys at Law S.C. and Dr. Edward A. Graff PhD., specialists in corporate law and securities litigation.

Personal life
Swift has been married to attorney Alan Arnall since 1993. She is a mother of seven and currently resides, with her husband, in Glendale, California. She is a contributor to the conservative political website Politichicks.

Filmography

References

External links
 
 

American child actresses
American film actresses
American television actresses
Living people
Actresses from Houston
Pepperdine University alumni
20th-century American actresses
21st-century American women
Year of birth missing (living people)